Mohmand District is a district in Peshawar Division of Khyber Pakhtunkhwa province in Pakistan. Until 2018, it was an agency of Federally Administered Tribal Areas, with merger of FATA with Khyber Pakhtunkhwa, it became a district. It was created as an agency in 1951.  Mohmand is bordered by Bajaur District to the north, Khyber District to the south, Malakand and Charsadda districts to the east and Peshawar district to the southeast.

Mr. Arif Ullah Awan is the current Deputy Commissioner of Mohmand District.

Administration 
Mohmand District is currently subdivided into seven Tehsils:

 Ambar Utman Khel Tehsil
 Halim Zai Tehsil
 Pindiali Tehsil
 Pran Ghar Tehsil
 Safi Tehsil
 Upper Mohmand Tehsil
 Yake Ghund Tehsil

Provincial Assembly

Demographics
At the time of the 2017 census the district had a population of 474,345, of which 241,549 were males and 232,755 females. The entire population was rural. The literacy rate was 30.39% - the male literacy rate was 47.68% while the female literacy rate was 12.82%. 381 people in the district were from religious minorities. Pashto was the predominant language, spoken by 98.83% of the population.

War on Terror
Despite its attraction for tourists, Mohmand District has been an area of conflict between Pakistan Army and some militant groups.

On September 16, 2011, security forces cleared ninety percent of Mohmand District from the militants, normal life was restored and development activities were launched. The Pakistan Army maintains an 8,200-man presence in Mohmand District following military operations to clear the region of militants.

In 2012, the Pakistani Army declared full control of Mohmand District and de-notified it as a conflict zone.

2020 Marble Mine Incident
 In Safi Tehsil a marble mine collapsed and  killed at least 19 people and more than 20 people were also injured.

See also 
Elazay
 Mohmand Rifles

References 

 
Districts of Khyber Pakhtunkhwa